The Mittagstal is a cirque in the Sella group in South Tyrol, Italy.

References 
Egon Pracht: Alpenvereinsführer Dolomiten Sellagruppe. Bergverlag Rudolf Rother, München 1980, .
Wanderkarte "Grödnertal", 1:25000, Mapgraphic Bozen

External links 

Valleys of South Tyrol